The Hollywood Storage Center of Thousand Oaks is a self storage and mini storage business located in Newbury Park, California. Services include self-storage, climate controlled storage, wine storage, safety deposit boxes, and vault storage. The storage company (originally called Thousand Oaks Self Storage) was founded by Spoony Singh, the founder of the Hollywood Wax Museum, in 1979.

The self-storage facility has a US Post Office and Penske Truck Rental on location and offers free electronic recycling through partner PC Recycle.

References

External links 
Hollywood Storage Center of Thousand Oaks - official site

Storage companies
Companies based in Ventura County, California
American companies established in 1979
1979 establishments in California